Petra Tierlich, born 25 February 1945, is an East German luger who competed in the 1960s. She won three medals in the women's singles event at the FIL World Luge Championships with a gold in 1969 and two silvers in 1965 and 1967.

References

SportQuick.com information on World champions in luge 

German female lugers
Living people
1945 births